Victoria Jiménez Kasintseva won the girls' singles tennis title at the 2020 Australian Open, defeating Weronika Baszak in the final, 5–7, 6–2, 6–2. This made her the first tennis player from Andorra to ever win a Grand Slam title in any discipline.

Clara Tauson was the defending champion, but chose not to participate.

Seeds

Draw

Finals

Top half

Section 1

Section 2

Bottom half

Section 3

Section 4

Qualifying

Seeds

Qualifiers

Draw

First qualifier

Second qualifier

Third qualifier

Fourth qualifier

Fifth qualifier

Sixth qualifier

Seventh qualifier

Eighth qualifier

References 

Girls' Singles
Australian Open, 2020 Girls' Singles